"Euro-Trash Girl" is a single by Cracker, released in 1994.  The song was originally released on the EP Tucson, and then as an unlisted track (track 69) on the album Kerosene Hat.  "River Euphrates" and "Bad Vibes Everybody" were also both originally on the EP Tucson. None of the other tracks on the single appear on any of their full-length albums.

The cover of Neil Young's "Fucking Up", the last and only live track on the single, has lead vocals sung by Mark Linkous.  It was recorded live at the Metro Chicago, courtesy of WXRT (according to the liner notes on the back of the CD).

Track listing

Euro-Trash Girl - 8:00
River Euphrates - 2:59
Bad Vibes Everybody - 2:36
Blue Danube Blues - 2:08
Fucking Up - 4:32

Cover

German band FSK covered the song on their 1996 album International, produced by Cracker's David Lowery (who also is an occasional member of the group).
 
The track was also covered by electroclash group Chicks On Speed for the debut 2000 album The Unreleases, and included on several compilations around that time.

References

=

1994 singles
Black-and-white music videos
Cracker (band) songs
1993 songs
Virgin Records singles